Elina Svitolina was the defending champion, but decided not to participate.

Leylah Fernandez won her maiden WTA singles title, defeating Viktorija Golubic in the final, 6–1, 6–4. Fernandez did not drop a set throughout the entire tournament.

Seeds

Draw

Finals

Top half

Bottom half

Qualifying

Seeds

Qualifiers

Lucky losers

Qualifying draw

First qualifier

Second qualifier

Third qualifier

Fourth qualifier

Fifth qualifier

Sixth qualifier

References

External Links
Main Draw
Qualifying Draw

2021 1
2021 WTA Tour